Teknikens Hus or The Technology House is a Swedish science center in Porsön, Luleå, Sweden. Supported by Luleå University of Technology, it calls itself "Sweden's northernmost science center".

Since 2005, it contains a Sedna 3D model, part of the Sweden Solar System.

References

External links
 Tekikens Hus Portal (in english)

Science and technology in Sweden
Luleå
Museums in Norrbotten County
Science museums in Sweden